
In basketball, a rebound is the act of gaining possession of the ball after a missed field goal or free throw. The National Collegiate Athletic Association's (NCAA) Division I's top 25 highest rebounders in men's basketball history are listed below. The NCAA did not split into its current divisions format until August 1973. From 1906 to 1955, there were no classifications to the NCAA nor its predecessor, the Intercollegiate Athletic Association of the United States (IAAUS). Then, from 1956 to spring 1973, colleges were classified as either "NCAA University Division (Major College)" or "NCAA College Division (Small College)".

College basketball's all-time leading rebounder is Tom Gola of La Salle. He recorded 2,201 rebounds (while also amassing 2,462 points) between 1951–52 and 1954–55. Gola is also one of seven players in the top 25 who have been enshrined in the Naismith Memorial Basketball Hall of Fame. The others are Bill Russell, Elvin Hayes, Elgin Baylor, Dave DeBusschere, Wes Unseld and Ralph Sampson. Robert Parish of Centenary, also a Hall of Famer, grabbed 1,820 rebounds which would have placed him fifth all-time. However, due to sanctions related to Parish's recruitment, the NCAA omitted all Centenary games and statistics from its official records starting with his freshman year of 1972–73 and continuing through the 1977–78 season, two years after Parish's graduation.

Three teams (Louisville, Wake Forest and Morehead State) each have two players in the top 25 all-time rebounding list. For Louisville, they are Charlie Tyra and Wes Unseld; for Wake Forest they are Dickie Hemric and Tim Duncan; and for Morehead State, they are Steve Hamilton and Kenneth Faried. Only one player, Elgin Baylor, split his college career at two different schools. He spent one season at Albertson College before transferring to Seattle University where he spent the next two years.

Key

Rebounding leaders

Top 25 all-time

Post-1973 era
In the official NCAA men's basketball record book, a distinction is drawn between the pre-1973 era and the post-1973 era. One reason is that because of the split into the three Divisions in use today (Divisions I, II and III), many of the rebounds accumulated in the pre-1973 era were against lesser-talented opponents that would be considered Division II, III or even NAIA in today's classification scheme. Although the 1972–73 season was before the divisional split, the NCAA officially considers that season to be "post-1973" because of the adoption of freshman eligibility for varsity play in all NCAA sports effective in August 1972. Listed below are the top 10 rebounders in NCAA Division I basketball since 1973.

References
General

Specific

NCAA Division I men's basketball statistical leaders